Franz-Josef Hönig (born 10 July 1942) is a German former professional footballer who played as a midfielder or forward. He spent seven seasons in the Bundesliga with Hamburger SV.

Honours
Hamburger SV
 UEFA Cup Winners' Cup finalist: 1967–68
 DFB-Pokal finalist: 1973–74

References

External links
 

1942 births
Living people
German footballers
Association football midfielders
Association football forwards
Bundesliga players
League of Ireland players
Holstein Kiel players
Hamburger SV players
Cork Celtic F.C. players
West German expatriate footballers
Expatriate association footballers in the Republic of Ireland
West German expatriate sportspeople in Ireland
West German footballers